Alternanthera nodiflora  (common name common joyweed) is a species of flowering plant in the family Amaranthaceae. It is endemic to  Australia, growing in all mainland states. It is naturalised  in Tasmania, over much of Africa, in Japan, and in Myanmar.

Description 
Alternanthera nodiflora is an erect annual herb. The branches are almost without a covering but the nodes are covered with dense intertwined hairs, and there are two lines of hairs along the branches. The leaves, too, are almost without a covering and are linear, 2-8 cm long and have smooth margins. The inflorescences are globular, and often clustered. The fruit is less than half the length of the perianth. The style is very short.

Taxonomy and naming 
It was first described by Robert Brown in 1810.  The type specimen is BM001015779 (collected on the east coast of Australia); Isotypes are E00279928 (collected at Broadsound), P00622600 (all three collected by Brown). The name is accepted by the Council of Heads of Australasian Herbaria, by Plants of the World online, but is considered a synonym of Alternanthera sessilis by Catalogue of Life.

The specific epithet, nodiflora, derives from the Latin, nodus,( "knot" or "node") and  flos, floris ("flower") to give an adjective describing the plant as having flowers arranged in a knot-shaped inflorescence or flowering at the nodes.

Gallery

References

External links
Alternanthera nodiflora occurrence data from Australasian Virtual Herbarium

Flora of Australia
nudiflora
Taxa named by Robert Brown (botanist, born 1773)